Chin-e Ruzah (also Romanized as Chīn-e Rūzah) is a village in Mazu Rural District, Alvar-e Garmsiri District, Andimeshk County, Khuzestan Province, Iran. At the 2006 census, its population was 45, in 9 families.

References 

Populated places in Andimeshk County